Erik Källgren (born 14 October 1996) is a Swedish professional ice hockey goaltender who is currently playing with the  Toronto Maple Leafs of the National Hockey League (NHL). Källgren was drafted in the seventh round, 183rd overall, of the 2015 NHL Entry Draft by the Arizona Coyotes, and made his NHL debut in 2022 with the Maple Leafs.

Playing career
In the 2020–21 season, Källgren appeared in 21 regular season games for the Växjö Lakers collecting 12 wins with a 2.37 goals-against average and a .911 save percentage. In 10 postseason games Källgren posted a 7–3–0 record with a .937 save percentage, capturing the Swedish Hockey League Championship.

As a free agent following his break out year, Källgren initially joined fellow SHL outfit, Frölunda HC, on a two-year deal on 17 May 2021. However just two days later, Källgren used his NHL opt out clause, agreeing to a two-year, two-way contract to return to North America with the Toronto Maple Leafs on 19 May 2021.

Källgren began the next season with the Toronto Marlies, but was called up by the team on March 10, 2022, on an emergency basis after starting netminder Jack Campbell was announced to have an injury. Källgren served as backup that same night in a game against the Arizona Coyotes. After goaltender Petr Mrázek allowed four goals on twelve shots, Källgren was placed in the team goal and made his NHL debut, playing just over 30 minutes and allowing one goal as the team fell in overtime, 5–4.

On March 15, 2022, Källgren recorded his first career NHL shutout in his first career NHL start against the Dallas Stars. Källgren faced 35 shots in the 4–0 victory. He became the fourth Maple Leaf goalie to record a shutout in his first NHL start.

Career statistics

Awards and honours

References

External links
 

1996 births
AIK IF players
Arizona Coyotes draft picks
HC TPS players
IK Oskarshamn players
Living people
Rapid City Rush players
Ice hockey people from Stockholm
Swedish ice hockey goaltenders
Toronto Maple Leafs players
Toronto Marlies players
Tucson Roadrunners players
Växjö Lakers players